Filippo Berardi (born 18 May 1997) is a Sammarinese professional footballer who plays as a right winger for the Italian Serie D club Sammaurese and the  San Marino national team.

Club career
On 12 July 2018, he joined Serie C club Monopoli on loan for the 2018–19 season.

On 14 August 2019, he signed a 2-year contract with Vibonese.

On 4 July 2021, he moved to Ancona-Matelica. On 20 January 2023, Berardi's contract with Ancona was terminated by mutual consent.

International
Berardi represented San Marino in various youth football teams. Berardi made his first appearance for the San Marino national football team in a 2018 World Cup qualifying 1–0 loss to Azerbaijan. He scored his first international goal in a 3–1 loss to Kazakhstan during a qualifying match for Euro 2020.

Career statistics

International

References

1997 births
Living people
People from the City of San Marino
Sammarinese footballers
Association football midfielders
Serie C players
Serie D players
Rimini F.C. 1912 players
Torino F.C. players
S.S. Juve Stabia players
S.S. Monopoli 1966 players
U.S. Vibonese Calcio players
Ancona-Matelica players
Sammarinese expatriate footballers
Sammarinese expatriate sportspeople in Italy
Expatriate footballers in Italy
San Marino youth international footballers
San Marino under-21 international footballers
San Marino international footballers